Furcifer viridis, the green chameleon, is a species of chameleon found in Madagascar.

References

Furcifer
Reptiles of Madagascar
Reptiles described in 2012
Taxa named by Christopher John Raxworthy